The Wuhan incident was an armed conflict in the People's Republic of China between two hostile groups who were fighting for control over the city of Wuhan in July 1967, at the height of the Cultural Revolution.  The two opposing forces were the "Million Heroes" and the "Wuhan Workers' General Headquarters". The former, numbering about 500,000 people, comprised mainly skilled workers, state and local party employees, and were supported by the local PLA, led by the commander of Wuhan Military Region, General Chen Zaidao. The "Wuhan Workers' General Headquarters", also numbering close to 500,000 people, comprised mostly workers and students from Red Guard organizations.

Both sides engaged in an extensive propaganda war in an attempt to enlist community support. Central authorities in Beijing eventually endorsed the Worker's Headquarters faction as the "true" revolutionary group and reprimanded Chen Zaidao for his military support to Million Heroes. The event was considered a pivotal turning point in the Cultural Revolution: it marked the first time military leaders refused to carry out orders given by the central authorities and the Cultural Revolution Group in particular. Fears of a more widespread PLA revolt led Mao and his core associates to scale back the movement's most radical components.

Background
All over China during the Cultural Revolution, provincial and municipal governments were replaced by organizations known as Revolutionary Committees (alliances of cadres, soldiers and student/worker groups) to take charge of governing the country and cleansing it from "counterrevolutionary forces" and "reactionary elements". With orders from the top leadership to "find and capture those in power walking the capitalist road," almost all incumbent party and government officials became vulnerable to attacks from Red Guard organizations - not owing to their ideological disposition but solely as a result of their incumbency. However, "capitalist roader" was a nebulous label that could be liberally applied to anyone perceived to be counter to the revolutionary spirit. Various mass organizations around the country took advantage of this chaotic backdrop and seized the opportunity to overthrow incumbent power figures with whom they may have carried other, unrelated grievances. In the central industrial city of Wuhan, two groups largely coalesced around those who wanted to preserve the incumbent political order in the city and those who wanted to overthrow it.

The Workers' Headquarters arose out of a union of local Red Guard youth and various "revolutionary" workers organizations from Wuhan's numerous steel plants. On January 27, 1967, they attempted to lay siege to the Wuhan party organization and the municipal government and then seize power in the city themselves, much in the fashion of the Shanghai People's Commune. However, incumbent interests rallied ordinary residents against the action and the takeover ultimately failed. It was thereafter branded as a "counterrevolutionary incident".

In March 1967, local PLA units under the command of General Chen Zaidao forcefully disbanded the Worker's Headquarters faction and detained some 500 of its leaders. At the same time, it had been funding its own "revolutionary mass organization", dubbed "The Million Heroes," drawn from a wider cross-section of conservative interests in the city. The Million Heroes, whose slogans were also broadly "revolutionary" in tone, were mainly intent on maintaining the status quo. Their position was that, in essence, the existing Wuhan political establishment was loyally adhering to the Cultural Revolution's main programme and therefore should not have been a target for struggle.

Central authorities in Beijing did not issue any public statements on the March 1967 actions taken by the PLA against the Workers' Headquarters faction; privately the Cultural Revolution Group (CRG) griped about the direction of the movement in Wuhan, but stopped short of issuing a rebuke to Wuhan's PLA leaders. Instead, they attempted to pull Chen Zaidao aside from a top-level military conference in Beijing in April and prod him into admitting that some of the March actions had gone too far and acknowledge that the local PLA may have made "mistakes" in their handling of the situation. Chen, however, refused to stand down, and insisted on the general correctness of the PLA's actions.

The "incident"
Tensions grew in Wuhan through April as the Worker's Headquarters faction carried out hunger strikes and conducted rallies, claiming to be the "true bearer" of the revolutionary cause; meanwhile, the Million Heroes accused the Worker's Headquarters of subverting the revolution by not properly adhering to the campaign to criticize Liu Shaoqi and Deng Xiaoping. Amid the growing hostilities, the CRG felt a greater urgency to respond and extend its 'divine interpretation' of the events on the ground. Under the auspice of Zhou Enlai and with approval from Mao, the authorities in Beijing issued an order to Chen to withdraw support to the Million Heroes. The directive asserted that the Wuhan military had made a mistake in "general orientation" in carrying out Cultural Revolution policies - that it must publicly admit that its March actions against Workers' Headquarters were incorrect. The directive also labelled the Million Heroes as a "conservative organization" and branded the Workers' Headquarters as a "revolutionary organization"; this was, in effect, the CRG throwing its weight behind the latter.

Minister of Public Security Xie Fuzhi and leading propagandist Wang Li arrived on July 16 and immediately ordered General Chen to withdraw support from the Million Heroes and instead extend it to the Workers' Headquarters.  The order, relayed through Xie to a gathering of the PLA leadership in Wuhan on July 19, could not be implemented; several of Chen Zaidao's units refused to carry out the order. Moreover, a significant sub-section of the city lent support to the Million Heroes, making their position a formidable one. Generally, Million Heroes supporters saw that their being labelled a "conservative" organization would have totally tarnished their leftist credentials and lent rival groups ammunition to attack them - giving them impetus to protest the order en masse. The local PLA organization, too, felt that if they were to accede to the order, it would be an implicit admission that they had committed a grave error in the course of the Cultural Revolution - something that could be used to attack them in the future.

In a last attempt to resolve the crisis, Zhou Enlai himself flew to Wuhan on July 20; for his own safety, Zhou landed at a nearby airstrip controlled by the PLA Air Force, a branch of the military loyal to Lin Biao (and therefore, the Cultural Revolution). Mao himself also traveled to the city secretly, staying at the Wuhan East Lake Guest House. Chen seemed to be swayed by Mao's own presence in Wuhan and acquiesced to write a self-criticism. Wang Li then gathered some 200 divisional officers at an impromptu conference and reprimanded them for failing to grasp the essence of the Cultural Revolution. His speech drew particular ire with the military brass due to its condescending tone.

Mao and Zhou's presence in Wuhan having been kept a secret, for all intents and purposes, the Million Heroes regarded Xie and Wang to be the main representatives of the central authorities. On July 20, forces belonging to Chen's mutinous PLA division, disturbed with the verdict assigned to the military district and the Million Heroes, captured and physically assaulted Xie Fuzhi, while simultaneously agitators from the Million Heroes captured Wang Li. Wang Li and Xie Fuzhi were rescued by military operatives as part of a secret operation and returned to Beijing on 25 July, to a hero's welcome, supposedly having saved the city from "counter-revolutionary" rebellion.

It is estimated that about one thousand people were killed, and tens of thousands more injured, in Wuhan during the July 1967 troubles in the city.

Aftermath
On July 26, Chen Zaidao and his political commissar Zhong Hanhua were dragged to Beijing's PLA-controlled Jingxi Hotel to take part in what essentially amounted to a "show trial" where central authorities in Beijing accused the Wuhan military establishment of supporting the wrong group in the preceding struggles in the city. Air Force Commander Wu Faxian, a Lin Biao loyalist, and security chief Xie Fuzhi accused Chen of a litany of crimes in front a large contingent of senior military and political leaders, many of whom, incredulous at the abuse being hurled on Chen, left in disgust during the meeting. Chen was also beaten by security personnel during the session. Chen and Zhong were then summarily dismissed and replaced with figures more loyal to the Cultural Revolution-friendly central leadership. The Wuhan event was branded as a "counter-revolutionary incident".

Following the incident, Jiang Qing, in a speech to Red Guard organizations in Henan province, introduced the idea of "use words to attack but use arms to defend" (i.e. wen-gong wu-wei). The incendiary remarks were taken by rebel organizations around the country as an endorsement of armed struggle, and led to the escalation of violent factional clashes across the country. The ensuing violence, some of which were directed squarely at various local PLA units, led Mao and his radical supporters to dial back their support for armed rebellion, likely due to their fears of a more widespread PLA reprisal. In order to appease the PLA and calm nerves among senior military leaders, Wang Li was arrested in August 1967, then scapegoated as the main instigator of the factional violence in Wuhan and sent to prison.

The Wuhan incident was the most serious uprising against the Cultural Revolution political order until the 1976 Tiananmen Incident. It is generally characterized by historians as an uprising of the Wuhan military establishment and a broad section of Wuhan society against the Cultural Revolution leadership. Indeed, Mao himself had been warned about the possibility of a 'coup' by Chen Zaidao in response to the verdict on the Wuhan Military Region, though in reality such a coup never materialized.

References

Notes

General sources

 

Cultural Revolution
1967 in China
History of Wuhan
July 1967 events in Asia